Cross Roads is a town in Denton County, Texas, United States. The population was 1,744 in 2020.

Geography

Cross Roads is located at  (33.231976, –97.001918).

Demographics

As of the 2020 United States census, there were 1,744 people, 357 households, and 312 families residing in the town.

Education 
Cross Roads is served by Aubrey Independent School District (in parts of northern Cross Roads) and Denton Independent School District (in the rest of the city).

Providence Elementary School serves most of Denton ISD Cross Roads, while a section is zoned to Cross Oaks Elementary School. All of the Denton ISD portion is zoned to Rodriguez Middle School, and Braswell High School.

The majority of Denton County, Cross Roads included, is in the boundary of North Central Texas College.

References

External links
 Town of Cross Roads official website

Dallas–Fort Worth metroplex
Towns in Denton County, Texas
Towns in Texas